Bill Kipsang Rotich, also known as Kipsang Rotich, is a voice actor best known for voicing the character Nien Nunb in the Star Wars films.

Early life
Bill Kipsang Rotich was born in 1958. Eldama Ravine, Koibatek, Kenya.

Education
He attended Eldama Ravine Mission Primary School for his primary education and later joined Nairobi School for his high school studies. After completing his secondary education he attended Dominican University in San Rafael, California. It is during this time that he landed the role to play the voice of Nien Nunb in Return of the Jedi.

Voice of Nien Nunb
Rotich voiced Nunb by speaking in Kalenjin and Kikuyu, both of which are spoken in Kenya. This turned him into a celebrity in Kenya because audiences there could understand what Nien Nunb was saying. Rotich then put a hold on his acting career and decided to pursue business.

Return to voice acting
After 32 years, Rotich was located by Star Wars producers to be the voice of Nien Nunb once more in Star Wars: The Force Awakens. He reprised the role in Star Wars: The Rise of Skywalker, Lego Star Wars: The Force Awakens, Star Wars: Rise of the Resistance, and Lego Star Wars: The Skywalker Saga.

References

External links
 Nien Nunb at the Star Wars Databank

1958 births
20th-century Kenyan male actors
21st-century Kenyan male actors
Dominican University of California alumni
Living people
Male voice actors
People from Rift Valley Province